Belmont University is a private Christian university in Nashville, Tennessee. Descended from Belmont Women's College, founded in 1890 by schoolteachers Ida Hood and Susan Heron, the institution was incorporated in 1951 as Belmont College. It became Belmont University in 1991. Belmont's current enrollment consists of approximately 8,900 students representing every state and 28 nations. The university served as the host site for the final presidential debate in the 2020 election cycle. Although the university cut its ties with the Tennessee Baptist Convention in 2007, it continues to emphasize a Christian identity.

History

The university originated in the founding of the Belmont Women's College in 1890 by Susan Ledley Heron and Ida Emily Hood. on the site of the Belmont Mansion, built by Joseph Acklen and Adelicia (Hayes) Acklen. Upon the retirement of Heron and Hood, Belmont Women's College merged with Ward Seminary in 1913 and was known as Ward—Belmont College, which included both a junior college and college-prep (or high) school for women. Today the Belmont Mansion is owned by Belmont University but maintained by the Belmont Mansion Association, a non-profit group. The mansion is open for tours and features Victorian art and furnishings. The water tower, gardens, with surviving gazebos and outdoor statuary from the Acklen era, are part of the college campus. In 1991, the school became Belmont University.

The university was awarded the Japanese Foreign Minister's Commendation for their contributions to promotion of mutual understanding between Japan and the United States on December 1, 2020.

Nashville's first radio station

The first radio station in Nashville went on air in May 1922 when, Boy Scout 
John "Jack" DeWitt, Jr., a 16-year-old high school student, installed a twenty-watt transmitter at Belmont. The station, WDAA, was born when Doctor C. E. Crosland, Associate President, realized the potential advertising value to the college of a radio station. The WDAA program on April 18, 1922, marked the first time a music program was broadcast in Nashville. DeWitt later became WSM (AM) radio station's chief engineer, 1932–1942, and president, 1947–1968.

Ties to the Tennessee Baptist Convention
In 1951, the Tennessee Baptist Convention bought Ward–Belmont College, the finishing school operated in Nashville by Ward–Belmont, Inc., which was facing severe financial difficulties. The Convention established the co-educational Belmont College in March of 1951, selecting R. Kelly White as president. In 1959, Herbert Gabhart succeeded White and Belmont received accreditation from the Southern Association of Schools and Colleges. Enrollment rose from 365 students to 2,000, and the college launched a music business program. He was succeeded by Bill Troutt in 1962, who, at 32, was the youngest college president in the nation. In 1991, it changed its name to Belmont University.

In 2005 Belmont's Board of Trustees sought to remove Belmont University from the control of the Tennessee Baptist Convention while remaining in a "fraternal relationship" with it. Advocates of this plan presented a blueprint for change in which all board members would be Christians but only 60 percent would be Baptists in order to affirm a Christian affinity while acknowledging the diversity of both the faculty and the student body. The head of the TBC would continue to be an ex officio board member. The TBC rejected this plan. In November 2005, TBC said it wanted to shift its financial support to two other institutions, Union University and Carson-Newman College, and Belmont would replace the three percent of its budget that was funded by the TBC. However, on April 7, 2006, TBC sought to oust the existing board and replace it with one consisting entirely of Southern Baptists and amenable to ongoing TBC control. After settlement talks failed, the Tennessee Baptist Convention Executive Board filed a lawsuit on September 29, 2006, against Belmont seeking the return of approximately $58 million.

Belmont severed its ties from the Tennessee Baptist Convention in 2007, with the announcement that it would be a Christian university without any denominational affiliations. Under its terms, the TBC and Belmont would disaffiliate amicably, with Belmont agreeing to pay one million dollars to the convention immediately, and $250,000 annually for the next forty years, for a total cost of $11 million. The university has stated its intent to maintain a Christian identity, but no longer a specifically Baptist one.

21st century
Belmont University became a catalyst for anti-discrimination protests in December 2010, when women's soccer coach Lisa Howe allegedly lost her job at the university on December 2 after announcing that she was having three children with her same sex partner. Howe's dismissal sparked protests from students and from local and national gay-rights advocates. These events led to a citywide anti-discrimination ordinance being passed by the Nashville City Council in January 2011. On January 26, 2011, President Bob Fisher announced that Belmont has added sexual orientation to the university's non-discrimination policies. Belmont is a Christian university which was widely regarded for its progressive ideals until the controversy broke out over Howe's departure. The college was criticized for not allowing a group with a mission to support gay students and explore the intersection of Christianity and homosexuality called Bridge Builders to officially form as a student group. At a news conference, Fisher stated that they had resubmitted the application. On February 27, 2011, Belmont University officially recognized the gay student organization for the first time. Belmont Provost Thomas Burns and Bridge Builders President Robbie Maris announced the decision to recognize the student group in a joint statement.

Acquisition of O'More College of Design
In February 2018, Belmont University took ownership of the O'More College of Design. On March 6, 2019, Belmont University announced that its current College of Visual and Performing Arts will be separated into two distinct colleges with defined areas of focus: the College of Music and Performing Arts will include all music, theatre and dance programs while the O'More College of Architecture, Art and Design will house architecture, art, fashion, interior design and design communications.

Acquisition of Watkins College
In February 2020, Belmont University announced that they would merge with Watkins College of Art, Design & Film, located in Nashville, Tennessee. Belmont and Watkins will evaluate employment needs based on the number of students transferring, existing capacities and related considerations. As a long-standing Christian institution, Belmont's policy is to hire faculty and staff who support the Christian institution's mission, vision and values; however, due to the nature of merging institutions, the university announced special consideration will be given to current Watkins employees regardless of their position of faith. In May 2021, Belmont sold the former Watkins College campus for $22.5 million, funds which the university  states will underwrite scholarships for students of the visual arts.

Controversy regarding connection to CoreCivic 
In July 2020, a group of Belmont University students and alumni began to draw attention to the university's longstanding relationship with CoreCivic (formerly the Corrections Corporation of America), asking the school to divest from any financial ties to CoreCivic and for-profit prisons. The relationship between CoreCivic and the university extends to the early 1980s. In 1983, notable Tennessee businessman Jack C. Massey, provided a portion of the initial funding to begin Corrections Corporation of America, along with Thomas Beasley. Discussed as early as 1966, Belmont's Massey Graduate School of Business was founded shortly after in 1986. Beasley has also funded major programs at the school, including a free enterprise institute at the Massey Business School. In 2018, Damon Hininger, CEO of CoreCivic, joined the Belmont University Board of Trustees. Shortly after students and alumni began a petition asking for his removal. Hininger is not the first board member with ties to CoreCivic. The current board includes Andrea Overby (donor to CoreCivic PAC in 2018 and wife of Charles Overby, former CCA board member) as well as John Ferguson (former CCA President). As of April 2021, Damon Hininger was no longer on a member of the board, having completed his allowed number of terms.

Presidents
 L. Gregory Jones (2021–present)
 Robert Fisher (2000-2021)
 Bill Troutt (1982-2000)
 Herbert Gabhart (1959-1982)
 R.Kelly White (1951-1959)

Academics
Belmont University offers bachelor's degrees in over 90 academic majors in nine colleges with more than 25 master's and five doctoral programs. Belmont and HCA created a health sciences consortium with local universities to alleviate the shortage of nurses and health care professionals in the local community, and provides students with shared office space and mentoring from faculty, local entrepreneurs and attorneys. Journalism students have gained work experience at The Oprah Winfrey Show, The Daily Show, CBS Evening News, and the British Broadcasting Corp.

Rankings and recognition
In the 2020 U.S. News & World Report college rankings, Belmont was tied for No. 166 in the category of National Universities. It is also tied for No. 121 as best college for veterans and tied for No. 17 in best undergraduate teaching. Previously, it was one of 64 institutions in the South recognized as a "Best Value", one of 20 institutions recognized for internship offerings across the nation, one of 18 institutions recognized in the nation for learning communities, one of 23 institutions recognized in the nation for service-learning, and one of 44 institutions in the nation recognized for study abroad opportunities.

For the applicant class of 2017–18, Belmont admitted 81% of its applicants. The class's average ACT score was 26 and the average SAT score was 1221. 27% of the class were in the top 10% of their high school's graduating, while 56% were in their class's top quarter. In 2017, 3.6% of the entering freshmen class were from New England, 21.2% were from the Midwest, 49.3% were from the South, 7.0% were from the Middle States, 7.8% were from the West, 9.9% were from the Southwest, and 1.2% were from "Other", a region including the U.S. territories, international students and those unspecified.

In fall 2017, the university had 7,587 students enrolled, a 4% increase from 2016. The overall, average graduation rate for Belmont is 67%.

Music and music business programs
Belmont's Mike Curb College of Entertainment & Music Business (CEMB) consists of current/former authors, performers, expert witnesses (for industry lawsuits), artist managers, lawyers, record label executives, songwriters, and others. Mike Curb is the CEO of Curb Records. He was a producer, songwriter and company executive and one of the most successful record men of the sixties and seventies. He is the department's namesake. The former dean of the CEMB, Jim Van Hook, is a legendary Nashville label head, especially as part of the Christian music industry.  One of the hallmarks of the program is its internship program, which sends hundreds of students annually out into the Nashville, New York, and Los Angeles music industries to intern for record labels, management companies, publishing companies, booking agencies, publicists, recording studios, law firms, and other businesses.

Besides having three professional-quality recording studios on campus, Belmont owns the Belmont Studios (including Ocean Way Nashville), part of which is operated for-profit (used by such artists as Dave Matthews, Sheryl Crow, and Bob Seger), and part of which is used by students. Ocean Way Nashville, purchased by Belmont in 2001, has recorded thousands of tracks including the score for The Last of Us, a top-selling game that won Best Audio in the global GANG (Game Audio Network Guild) Awards.

Schools and colleges
College of Education
College of Law
College of Liberal Arts & Social Sciences
College of Pharmacy
College of Sciences & Mathematics
College of Theology & Christian Ministry
College of Music & Performing Arts
Gordon E. Inman College of Health Sciences & Nursing
Interdisciplinary Studies & Global Education
Jack C. Massey College of Business
The Mike Curb College of Entertainment & Music Business (CEMB)
O'More College of Architecture & Design
Watkins College of Art

Campuses

Main campus (Nashville)

In June 2006, Belmont opened the $18 million Gordon E. Inman Center that houses the Gordon E. Inman College of Health Sciences and Nursing. The building has three stories of classroom space that contain learning labs equipped with Sim Man mannequins that respond to the actions of the nursing students. There are classrooms for adult and pediatric occupational therapy, maternity and neonatal care complete with Sim Man babies and a birthing Sim Woman, orthopedics lab, and many classrooms of various sizes.

Belmont houses the Curb Event Center, a 5000-seat multi-purpose arena, which is used for basketball games, concerts, and other events like the 2006, 2007 and 2008 CMT Awards, and the 2008 Presidential Debate. The facility is connected to the Beaman Student Life Center and Maddox Grand Atrium—collectively, a $52 million development.

In 2015, the university opened its R. Milton and Denice Johnson Center, home to Belmont's Curb College, Department of Media Studies, Motion Pictures and Harrington Place Dining.

Regional campus
"Williamson Center" in suburban Franklin, Tennessee. This center for professional education and corporate meetings opened in January 2015. It includes classrooms for Belmont's adult degree, professional, and continuing education programs. It also provides space for area businesses to lease for events and meetings. This facility replaced the university's first center in Cool Springs, which had opened in 2002 on Seaboard Lane.

National campuses
Los Angeles (Belmont West)
New York City (Belmont East)

Student life
Belmont has over 190 student organizations. These include the Student Government Association (SGA), The Student Activities Programming Board (SAPB), Greek organizations,  as well as other special interest organizations.

The largest student organization on campus is Service Corps, which focuses on volunteer work inside the music industry and is open only to students enrolled in the Mike Curb College of Entertainment and Music Business.

Belmont's Greek community consists of five sororities and four fraternities. The sororities are Alpha Gamma Delta, Alpha Kappa Alpha, Alpha Sigma Tau, Delta Sigma Theta, Kappa Alpha Theta, and Phi Mu.  The fraternities include Phi Kappa Tau, Alpha Phi Alpha, Phi Mu Alpha,  and Phi Beta Sigma. In the spring of 2017, approximately 17% of full-time undergraduate students at Belmont were members of fraternities and sororities.

Belmont has a large music program, and a variety of musical ensembles exist on the campus. There are currently 15 vocal ensembles and 23 instrumental ensembles. In addition, there are three student-run a cappella groups: The Beltones (mixed ensemble), Prismatics (mixed), and Pitchmen (TTBB). All three a cappella groups compete in the International Championship of Collegiate A Cappella (ICCA) regularly. The Beltones have advanced to ICCA finals three times and placed 4th at the event in 2014. The Pitchmen qualified for ICCA finals in 2020 but the event was cancelled due to the COVID-19 pandemic. In 2020, The A Cappella Archive ranked The Beltones at #8 amongst all ICCA-competing groups since 1996. Belmont is home to two Greek-lettered music fraternities, Sigma Alpha Iota and Phi Mu Alpha Sinfonia, as well as a chapter for the national theatre fraternity, Alpha Psi Omega.

Belmont operates one student newspaper called The Vision, published monthly.

Points of interest

Main campus attractions
Belmont Mansion
The Bell Tower – The first carillon in Tennessee and among the first 25 installed in North America.
Curb Event Center

Off-campus facilities
E.S. Rose Park – Metro Nashville Parks owned property in partnership with Belmont University – hosts NCAA Div.I baseball, soccer, softball, and track.

Athletics

Belmont is a member of the NCAA Division I and is a member of the Missouri Valley Conference in all of Belmont's sports except men's soccer, which its previous conference, the Ohio Valley, does not sponsor.  On September 28, 2021, Belmont announced that it would become a member of the Missouri Valley Conference, beginning in Fall of 2022. Until July 1, 2012, Belmont had been a member of the Atlantic Sun Conference, a non-football conference. The men's soccer team was most recently an independent before joining the Horizon League effective with the 2014 season.

In the mid-1990s, Belmont changed its nickname to the "Bruins", replacing the earlier mascot of Rebels due to its association with the Confederacy. Bruin is Middle English for bear from the Dutch fable "History of Reynard the Fox", translated by William Caxton.

In 2011 Belmont student-athletes won the Atlantic Sun Conference Academic Trophy for the eighth time in ten years with 76.32 per cent of the student-athletes achieving at least a 3.0 grade-point average.

In 2012 Belmont student-athletes won the Ohio Valley Conference Institutional Academic Achievement Award for the first time after joining the conference last year.

In 2015, Belmont received the OVC's Institutional Academic Achievement Award, presented each year to the member institution with the greatest percentage of its eligible student-athletes that earn a 3.25 GPA or higher. This award marked the 4th straight year for Belmont, who joined the OVC only 4 years prior.

Presidential debates

On November 19, 2007, The Commission on Presidential Debates chose Belmont University from sixteen finalists to host one of three Presidential election debates on October 7, 2008. The debate at Belmont was a "town-hall" style debate with questions fielded from the audience.

In 2019, the Commission on Presidential Debates selected Belmont to host the third and final presidential debate on October 22. The second presidential debate, scheduled for Oct. 15 in Miami, was canceled. The Belmont debate, the final debate in the 2020 election cycle between then candidates President Donald Trump and former Vice President Joe Biden, occurred as scheduled NBC News' Kristen Welker moderating.

Notable alumni

Athletics
Jay Ayres, professional soccer player 
Matt Beaty, Major League Baseball player for the Los Angeles Dodgers
Brian Baker, professional tennis player
 Alysha Clark (born 1987), American-Israeli basketball player for the Seattle Storm of the Women's National Basketball Association
Ian Clark, NBA player
Stu Grimson, former NHL enforcer 
Joshua McAdams, track and field athlete 
Ricardo Patton, head basketball coach at Central High School
 Nico Olsak, Argentinian-born American-Israeli soccer player who plays in the Israeli Premier League
J. P. Rodrigues, professional soccer player
Evan Bradds, assistant basketball coach
J.J. Mann, professional basketball player
Alex Renfroe, professional basketball player
Dylan Windler, professional basketball player

Arts, film, and literature
McKinley Belcher III, actor
Kayla Braxton, WWE broadcaster
Jean Faircloth, philanthropist
Elizabeth P. Farrington, publisher of the Honolulu Star-Bulletin and Congressional Delegate 
Sean Hetherington, reality TV producer and pundit
H. L. Hix, poet and academic
Michael Jackman, columnist, poet, essayist, fiction writer, and college professor
Clare Boothe Luce, editor and playwright
DJ Qualls, actor
Masood Ashraf Raja, associate professor University of North Texas 
Duane Simolke, writer
Rachel Smith, Miss Tennessee Teen USA 2002, Miss Tennessee USA 2007, and Miss USA 2007
Tony Vincent, actor
Lila Acheson Wallace, co-founder of Reader's Digest 
Lisa Williams, poet

Business
Damon T. Hininger, MBA, chief executive officer of the Corrections Corporation of America.
R. Milton Johnson, chairman and CEO of Hospital Corporation of America.

Government
Diane Black, U.S. Representative from Tennessee
Samuel Atta Mills, Member of parliament (Ghana)

Music

Greg Bates, country music singer-songwriter 
Didi Benami, American Idol finalist
Jimmy Bowen, American record producer and former pop music performer
Becca Bradley, American CCM musician and cellist
Logan Brill, singer/songwriter
Celeste Buckingham, Slovak singer-songwriter and pop musician
Sarah Buxton, country music artist 
Chuck Cannon, songwriter 
Steven Curtis Chapman, Grammy award-winning Christian artist 
Brandy Clark, country music artist
Coin, alternative band; Chase Lawrence and Joe Memmel are alumni
Travis Cottrell, Christian artist 
Cowboy Crush, country music band; all five members are alumnae
Devin Dawson, country music artist
The Delta Saints, rock/blues band; members Ben Ringel and David Supica are alumni
Denver and the Mile High Orchestra, "big band" featured as a finalist on The Next Great American Band 
Russell Dickerson, country music artist
Melinda Doolittle, American Idol finalist
Jace Everett, recording artist 
Sharon Gilchrist, bluegrass musician and singer 
Andrew Greer, singer-songwriter 
Ashley Gorley, songwriter and producer 
Helen Hemphill, author 
Tyler Hubbard, half of country music group Florida Georgia Line
Ashlyne Huff, singer-songwriter 
Jeff Irwin, musician
Julienne Irwin, America's Got Talent finalist 
Tamara "Taj" Johnson-George, member of R&B group SWV, author, and Survivor: Tocantins contestant 
Judah & the Lion, alternative and folk band
Brian Kelley, half of country music group Florida Georgia Line
Gordon Kennedy, co-writer of Eric Clapton song "Change the World" and Grammy winner (1996 Song of the Year, 2006 Best Pop Instrumental Album)
 Hannah Kerr, CCM Singer
LANY, three-piece alternative band from Los Angeles, California consisting of Paul Jason Klein, Les Priest, and Jake Goss 
Lara Landon, American CCM recording artist
Levi Kreis, Tony Award-winning music artist
Jesse Lee, country music singer 
Jim Lill, American country musician 
Kimberley Locke, American Idol finalist, music star, and plus-size model 
Kelley Lovelace, American songwriter
Willie Mack, singer-songwriter
Mary Virginia Martin, actress, singer and Broadway star 
Sandra McCracken, 1999, singer-songwriter.
Mikeschair, Christian band 
Moon Taxi, indie-alternative rock band; all five members are alumnae 
Grace Moore, American operatic soprano and actress in musical theatre and film 
Ginny Owens, Christian music artist 
John Mark Painter, American musician and songwriter, member of rock-and-roll duo Fleming and John 
Brad Paisley, country music artist
Minnie Pearl (real name Sarah Cannon) of Grand Ole Opry and Hee Haw fame; attended Belmont's predecessor, the Ward–Belmont School. 
Jill Phillips, Christian music artist 
Julie Roberts, country music artist
Frank Rogers, record producer 
Mackenzie Scott, performs as TORRES
Harold "FYÜTCH" Simmons, rapper, singer, songwriter, producer
Canaan Smith, country music singer-songwriter 
Todd Smith, Christian artist, lead singer of Selah 
Ric Steel, vocalist and instrumentalist 
Larry Stewart, country music artist, lead singer of Restless Heart 
Pam Tillis, country music artist 
Josh Turner, country music artist 
Troy Verges, songwriter 
Lee Ann Womack, country music artist
Trisha Yearwood, country music artist
Julianna Zobrist, Christian singer
Jake Wesley Rogers, musician

Notable faculty
 Alberto Gonzales, former United States Attorney General, is the Doyle Rogers Distinguished Chair of Law.
 Mark Volman, a founding member of the Turtles, is an associate professor of entertainment industry studies.
 Alan Shacklock, music producer, is a professor of audio engineering technology.
 Ryan Fox, a former Jeopardy Champion, is a professor of Mathematics.

References

External links

Belmont University Athletics website

 
Universities and colleges in Nashville, Tennessee
Private universities and colleges in Tennessee
Universities and colleges accredited by the Southern Association of Colleges and Schools
University and college buildings on the National Register of Historic Places in Tennessee
Educational institutions established in 1890
1890 establishments in Tennessee
National Register of Historic Places in Nashville, Tennessee
Former women's universities and colleges in the United States